The 1964 Stanford Indians football team represented Stanford University during the 1964 NCAA University Division football season. They were coached by John Ralston in his second season, and played their home games at Stanford Stadium in Stanford, California. Despite a generally mediocre season, the Indians dealt undefeated #7 Oregon its first loss and also beat #8 and Rose Bowl-bound Oregon State two weeks later.

Schedule

Players drafted by the NFL/AFL

References

External links
 Game program: Stanford vs. Washington State at Spokane – September 19, 1964

Stanford
Stanford Cardinal football seasons
Stanford Indians football